Jordan competed at the 2013 World Aquatics Championships in Barcelona, Spain between 19 July and 4 August 2013.

Swimming

Jordanian swimmers achieved qualifying standards in the following events (up to a maximum of 2 swimmers in each event at the A-standard entry time, and 1 at the B-standard):

Men

Women

See also
Jordan at other World Championships in 2013
 Jordan at the 2013 UCI Road World Championships
 Jordan at the 2013 World Championships in Athletics

References

External links
Barcelona 2013 Official Site
JSF web site

Nations at the 2013 World Aquatics Championships
2013 in Jordanian sport
Jordan at the World Aquatics Championships